Dialampsis is a genus of flies in the family Stratiomyidae.

Distribution
Papua New Guinea.

Species
Dialampsis argentata (Wulp, 1898)

References

Stratiomyidae
Brachycera genera
Taxa named by Kálmán Kertész
Diptera of Australasia
Endemic fauna of Papua New Guinea